E56 may refer to:
 European route E56
 HMS E56
 Nimzo-Indian Defence, Encyclopaedia of Chess Openings code
 Kōchi Expressway (between Kochi IC and Shimantocho-chuo IC), Nakamura-Sukumo Road and Matsuyama Expressway (between Matsuyama IC and Tsushimawa-Matsu IC), route E56 in Japan